IWD may refer to:

Aviation 
Gogebic–Iron County Airport (IATA code: IWD)
Iberworld, a Spanish airline (ICAO code: IWD)

Businesses 
IShares Russell 1000 Value Index, an exchange-traded fund with ticker symbol IWD
Ivor Watkins Dow, now known as Dow Agrosciences

Events 
International Women's Day, on March 8
International Workers' Day, on May 1

Technology
Individual wheel drive, an electric vehicle drivetrain